The Black Forest Fire was a forest fire that began near Highway 83 and Shoup Road in Black Forest, Colorado around 1:00 p.m. on June 11, 2013. As of June 20, 2013, the fire was 100 percent contained,  were burned, at least 509 homes were said to be destroyed, and two people had died. This was the most destructive fire in the state's history at the time, surpassing the 2012 Waldo Canyon Fire which also began near Colorado Springs. It was surpassed in 2021, when the Marshall Fire destroyed over 1,000 homes in Boulder County, in Superior and Louisville.

The evacuation area covered  acres, 13,000 homes and 38,000 people. Three shelters were established in the area, including Elbert County Fairgrounds, which accepted humans, pets, and large animals. Two other shelters were designated for large animals only.

On June 13, the Denver Post reported, 457 firefighters were working the fireline, including agencies around the fire, the Colorado Air National Guard, and select personnel from fire suppression teams on Fort Carson and the nearby United States Air Force Academy. Of note, 3 x UH-60 and 3 x CH-47 from 2-4 GSAB along with some crews from 3-4 AHB (4th Combat Aviation Brigade) were instrumental in providing immediate response to assist in fighting the fires.  The Battalion, commanded by LTC Tyler Smith, launched with very little notice to provide much needed support to the Front Range region.  One of the CH-47D aircraft "Patches", was involved in the effort on every day.  Governor John Hickenlooper addressed Emergency Managers at the command post on June 12.  U.S. Northern Command assisted with fire fighting efforts.

Background and ignition

Record setting heat in the region, and a Red Flag Warning from the National Weather Service set the stage for an explosive fire situation. In the early afternoon hours of Tuesday, June 11, 2013, beginning before 2:00 p.m. MDT, reports of a wildfire in the Black Forest area reached 9-1-1 dispatchers. The initial 9-1-1 call came from Gregg Cawlfield, reporting a small structure fire. Cell phone video he captured shows the fire started as a small, localized event. The record heat and high winds quickly spread the flames to several hundred acres. As of June 20, the investigation into the cause and timeline of events continued.

The National Weather Service in Pueblo, Colorado issued notices for severe fire weather starting at 2:00 p.m. on June 12, with low humidity, high winds, and temperatures approaching  expected to drive the fire. As of 4:50 a.m., the evacuation area stood at 55 square miles, with firefighters from agencies around the state of Colorado being mobilized, as well as helicopters and military aircraft.

In the afternoon hours of June 12, the fire exploded in size driven by dry winds, jumping fire lines and spreading out to the east, north, and west. Evacuation areas were expanded from El Paso County into Douglas and Elbert Counties, and west to Interstate 25. Some evacuation shelters were forced to evacuate due to smoke.

Firefighters experienced additional frustrations with intrusions of road closures on Highway 83, Walker Road, and Evans Road, according to scanner traffic observed by The Gazette. Also observed by reporters over the scanner were instances of news media helicopters violating closed airspace above the fire, creating hazardous situations and the potential for an air disaster.

Heavy smoke being pushed by the south/south-easterly winds covered most of the populated areas of Douglas County and pushed into other Denver suburbs.

Fire investigators confirmed that lightning had been ruled out as a cause of the fire. The investigation centers just north of Shoup Road near Darr Drive, an area with many homes in a heavily wooded area.

Destruction
Within 2 days of ignition, the Black Forest fire surpassed the previous year's Waldo Canyon fire as the most destructive fire in Colorado history. El Paso County Sheriff Terry Maketa stated that at least 360 homes had been lost and 15,000 acres had burned as of the June 13 morning briefing. It was also released that 1,205 homes were still unaffected by the fire, and 38,000 residents had been evacuated from 13,000 homes so far. The National Weather Service predicted a third day of hot, dry, windy weather for the fire area, especially in late afternoon. Isolated thunderstorms were expected.

Already the most destructive fire in Colorado history, the fire remained at zero containment throughout the day with weather forecasts showing no natural relief in sight.

By late Thursday morning, the fire had also severed the broadcast transmission line for 740 AM KVOR, which operates a transmitter in the evacuation zone. As a result, crews were unable to enter the area to repair the transmission line. The Gazette reported that KVOR moved to 1300 AM, a sister station.

Sheriff Terry Maketa reported two fatalities were discovered, and the victims appeared to have died while attempting to evacuate their home. Dry lightning and thunderstorms were also reported forming in the area, including one sparking a brief-lived sister fire north of Cripple Creek.

Maketa announced on Friday morning that 19 more homes burned, totaling 379 and in the evening, his office further updated this number to 419.

Containment
Firefighters were able to make some important gains the evening of Friday, June 14, when some cloud cover and rain moved into the area, bringing containment to 30 percent that night.

It was announced in the early morning hours of Saturday, June 15 that the sheriff's office had updated some information at midnight, including the number of homes burnt rising to 473 and containment of the blaze rising to 30 percent. By evening, KOAA reported the fire as 55 percent contained and the number of houses destroyed as 483.

On Sunday, June 16 the Denver Post reported that the fire was 65 percent contained and the number of homes destroyed had climbed to 485. The burned area was downgraded from 15,000 to 14,198 acres due to better mapping.  The firefighting costs had reached $5.2 million.

At 7:30 p.m. June 16, the Sheriff's office released new data on the number of homes affected: 3,633 unaffected, 483 total loss, and 17 with partial damage. Due to lessons learned from the Waldo Canyon Fire, a publicly accessible list of affected homes was published by the Sheriff's office and updated on a regular basis, using the same web address to reflect ongoing updates to this data in real time. At 8:00 p.m., more areas that were on mandatory evacuation were changed to pre-evacuation status to allow residents in those areas to return home.

As of Friday, June 22, the number of homes lost had risen to 511.

Residents return
As of 10:00 a.m. Thursday, June 20, the Sheriff's office allowed residents to return to most of the burn area, though a small area including Darr Circle, Falcon Drive, Peregrine Way and the adjacent section of Shoup Road continued to be closed to residents and the public due to an ongoing crime scene investigation.

In an interview at noon Thursday, which was announced to be the last press conference for the Black Forest fire with 100 percent containment expected by that night, Sheriff Maketa announced that while area residents were allowed to reenter their property as of that morning, the area would not be opened to the general public until Saturday.

Aftermath
As of Friday, June 21, the fire was completely contained, but the total number of homes lost had risen to 509, and Sheriff Maketa stated that the assessed value of the lost homes totaled about $90 million. The number was revised upward the next day to 511 homes lost. As of June 20, 2013, the cost for fighting the fire was estimated at $9,323,955.

At the completion of the first of four parts of the Black Forest assessment in early July, the El Paso County Accessor's office reported that the fire destroyed 486 homes — fewer than the sheriff's department's initial estimate of 511 — and damaged 37, causing $85,444,052 in damage.    Sixteen members of the office, who have been working full-time on the fire, must now put dollar amounts to lost outbuildings, commercial structures and, perhaps most costly, trees. A treeless lot sells for about 30 percent less than one with pristine trees, and buyers will pay about 15 percent less for a lot with damaged trees. The assessor's office came up with its totals after on-site inspections of 2,400 parcels. "We will probably have to review Black Forest in a year or two because we have no guarantee that those trees that were damaged are going to make it," county assessor Mark Lowderman said.

Authorities continued to investigate the cause of the fire, which killed a married couple, Marc Allen Herklotz, 52, and his wife, Robin Lauran Herklotz, 50, who were attempting to flee the area. The bodies were discovered Thursday June 13 in what was the garage of a home that the blaze had leveled. They were next to a car with its doors open. The car's trunk was packed full of belongings. The sheriff's office, which said the fire's cause was not natural, has executed search warrants and conducted interviews.

See also
 2013 Colorado wildfires
 Royal Gorge fire, another fire in Colorado that started on the same day
 Waldo Canyon fire, previously the most destructive wildfire in Colorado history

References

External links

 Black Forest Burn Map - Hosted by lmf-llc.com
 Evacuation and pre-evacuation zones hosted by Google Maps
 Another map of the evacuation areas via Google Maps Engine
 Black Forest fire at InciWeb 

Wildfires in Colorado
2013 wildfires in the United States
2013 in Colorado
History of Colorado Springs, Colorado